Roseofilum reptotaenium, also called coral killer, is a unicellular species of cyanobacteria. It is the pathogenic agent responsible for black band disease on Siderastrea siderea coral.

References

Oscillatoriales